Bakshi Ka Talab is a nagar panchayat town in Lucknow district of Uttar Pradesh, India. It is also the headquarters of a corresponding tehsil, as well as a community development block of the same name. As of 2011, its population was 49,166, in 8,728 households. It consists of both residential and business settlements. Bakshi Ka Talab is an organised settlement developed by Lucknow Development Authority (LDA). It is connected to Lucknow via National Highway 24.

Bakshi Ka Talab features the annual play Ramlila, staged since 1972, wherein lead characters like Rama, Lakshamana and Hanumana are played by Muslim youths.this was started by Dr Muzzafar Ahmad. This play has also been adapted into radio play "Us gaon ki ramlila" to promote communal harmony among the masses. 

The three main commodities produced here are cement tiles and pipes, soap, and furniture. The famous Chandrika Devi Temple is located in nearby Kathwara.

Name and history 
Bakshi Ka Talab is named after its large tank built by Bakhshi Tipur Chand, who was paymaster for Nasir-ud-Din Haidar Shah in the first half of the 19th century. This structure was built with flights of stairs descending to the water's surface on all four sides, and four towers marking the corners. A temple to Banke Bihari was built facing the main road, and next to it, Bakhshi Tipur Chand had a mansion built, along with a walled garden. By the turn of the 20th century, the complex had fallen into ruin. Around that time, Bakshi Ka Talab was described as being within the land belonging to Rudahi village, to the west. It had a train station on the Lucknow–Bareilly Railway, a post office, and a village school.

Bakshi Ka Talab was first upgraded to nagar panchayat status for the 2011 Census, with 23 villages being merged into the territory of the city..Currently Arun Singh Gappu is chairman of Bakshi Ka Talab Nagar Panchayat.

Demographics 
As of 2011, the population of Bakshi Ka Talab town was 49,166, in 8,728 households. Children ages 0-6 numbered 6,783, making up 13.8% of the town's population. The town's sex ratio was 910 females for every 1000 males; in the 0-6 age group it was 947. Members of scheduled castes made up 30.2% of town residents (the highest among cities in Lucknow district), and no residents were recorded as belonging to scheduled tribes. The literacy rate of Bakshi Ka Talab town was 73.8% (81.7% of males and 65.3% of females, ages 7 and up).

At the block level, the population of Bakshi Ka Talab's rural areas was 239,938, which was the highest among blocks in Lucknow district.

Education 
Bakshi Ka Talab has many schools including SR Institute of management, Institute of Technology and Management (ITM) Lucknow, St. Xavier's Inter College, Lawrence Homan Public School, R.R. Group Of Institutions.

There are government and private higher education institutions such as Chandra Bhanu Gupt Krishi Mahavidyalaya, GCRG Memorial Trust's Group of Institutions, B.N. College of Engineering & Technology, and ITM School of Architecture and Town Planning.

Villages 
Bakshi Ka Talab block contains the following 161 villages:

References

Cities and towns in Lucknow district